Garry Louis Pagel (born 17 September 1966), is a former South African rugby union player who played for South Africa between 1995 and 1996.

After retiring from a professional career in rugby, Pagel returned to farming. He resides in the Eastern Cape.

Career

Provincial and club

In 1997, Pagel moved to England and played for the English side Northampton Saints between 1997 and 2001. He made 77 appearances, scoring 50 points from 10 tries, and played in the side that won the Heineken Cup in 2000.

International
Pagel played his first test match for the Springboks as a replacement in the opening match of the 1995 Rugby World Cup, on 25 May 1995 against Australia at Newlands in Cape Town. During the World Cup final, he replaced Balie Swart after 68 minutes at tighthead, allowing him to play the rest of the match, including the extra time. After the World Cup, he only played in one further test match for the Springboks. He also played in three tour matches for the Sringboks.

Test history
 World Cup Final

World Cup
 1995 : World Champions, 4 selections (Wallabies, Romania, Canada, All Blacks).

Honours

With the Springboks
 1995 World Cup winners

With Western Province
 1997 Currie Cup winning squad

With Northampton
 2000 Heineken Cup winners

See also
List of South Africa national rugby union players – Springbok no. 628

References

External links
 
 Springboks site
 scrum.com statistics

South African rugby union players
South Africa international rugby union players
Rugby union props
1966 births
Living people
Western Province (rugby union) players
Eastern Province Elephants players
Northampton Saints players
Rugby union players from the Eastern Cape